"World Without You" is a song by American musician and singer Belinda Carlisle, released as the fifth single from her second album, Heaven on Earth (1987). It peaked at number 34 in the UK, number 21 in Ireland and number 43 in Italy.

Critical reception
Pan-European magazine Music & Media wrote, "Shirelles meet Richard Marx in this definitively radio-friendly number."

Music video
A music video using concert footage was produced to promote the single.

Track listing
"World Without You" (Extended Worldwide Mix)
"World Without You" (7-inch remix)
"Nobody Owns Me" (Album version)

Charts

References

External links
Belinda Carlisle 1987 singles at BelindaVault

1988 singles
Belinda Carlisle songs
Songs written by Diane Warren
1987 songs
Virgin Records singles
MCA Records singles
Song recordings produced by Rick Nowels